Kuang may refer to:
Kuang (surname) (邝/鄺), a Chinese surname
Kuang (town), a town in Selangor, Malaysia
Kuang (state constituency), a constituency of the Selangor State Legislative Assembly

See also
Guang (disambiguation)
Kwang, a Korean given name and name element